Alibis is the second studio album by American country music artist Tracy Lawrence. Certified platinum in the United States, the album produced the singles "Can't Break It to My Heart", "Alibis", "My Second Home", and "If the Good Die Young", all number-one hits on the Billboard Hot Country Singles & Tracks chart. The album is certified 2× Multi-Platinum by the RIAA for shipments of two million copies. It was recorded by James Stroud in full analog at his home studios.

Track listing

Personnel

Musicians
Eddie Bayers – drums
Larry Byrom – acoustic guitar
Mark Casstevens – acoustic guitar
Sonny Garrish – steel guitar, Dobro
Tracy Lawrence – lead vocals
Chris Leuzinger – electric guitar
Brent Rowan – electric guitar
Gary Smith – piano, synthesizer
Joe Spivey – fiddle
James Stroud – drums, percussion
Glenn Worf – bass guitar
Curtis Wright – background vocals
Curtis Young – background vocals

Technical
Derek Bason – mixing assistant
Jeff Giedt – assistant engineer
Kelly Giedt – assistant producer
Julian King – engineering, mixing
Steve Marcantonio – engineer
Glenn Meadows – mastering
Lynn Peterzell – engineer, mixing

Charts

Weekly charts

Year-end charts

References

1993 albums
Tracy Lawrence albums
Albums produced by James Stroud
Atlantic Records albums